The University of Chicago Harris School of Public Policy is the public policy school of the University of Chicago in Chicago, Illinois, United States. It is located on the University of Chicago's main campus in Hyde Park. The school's namesake is businessman Irving B. Harris, who made a donation that established the Harris School in 1986. In addition to policy studies and policy analysis, the school requires its students to pursue training in economics and statistics through preliminary examinations and course requirements. Harris Public Policy offers joint degrees with the Booth School of Business, Law School, School of Social Service Administration, and the Graduate Division of the Social Sciences.

In 2014, Harris Public Policy received two gifts totaling $32.5 million for a physical expansion. A former residence hall designed by architect Edward Durell Stone was renovated and renamed The Keller Center, housing the Harris School of Public Policy as of 2019. The Keller Center's Forum provides a venue for speakers and open work space.  Harris is ranked third among policy analysis schools in the United States, and listed as the second best public policy institution globally in the field of economics research by RePEc.

History

The Harris School of Public Policy was predated by the Committee on Public Policy and The University of Chicago Center for Policy Study. The Center on Public Policy, established in 1966, was a research center and so did not offer degrees. The Center hosted fellows and conferences and published research in the field of public policy, primarily urban studies and urban journalism. The Committee on Public Policy was formed to offer master's degrees to students interested in policy studies. The Committee, formed of professors employed by different academic divisions, began offering classes in 1976 to a small group of one-year Master's students who had applied internally from other graduate divisions within the University of Chicago. The Committee's long term viability was called into question for reasons including the small demand for one year master's degrees in public policy and weak administrative support for such a small program. Over the next three years the Committee began offering two year degrees, joint BA/MA degrees and PhDs, but it continued to be threatened by weak administrative support and unstable funding. In 1986 a committee of Deans recommended the Committee should secure a better endowment and become a professional school or be dissolved. At that time Irving Harris pledged $6.9 million in order to create the public policy school, a figure he later raised to $10 million. In 1988 the Harris School of Public Policy opened in the former American Bar Association Building which it has shared with affiliates including NORC at the University of Chicago and the Bulletin of the Atomic Scientists. In 2019, the Harris School moved to the newly renovated Keller Center.

Curriculum

The Harris Public Policy offers the following full-time professional master's degree programs:

 Master of Public Policy (MPP), a two-year program
 Master of Science (MS) in Computational Analysis and Public Policy, a two-year program offered with the Department of Computer Science
 Master of Science (MS) in Environmental Science and Policy, a two-year program offered with Argonne National Laboratory
 Master of Arts (MA) in Public Policy, a 9-month program
 Master of Arts (MA) in Public Policy with Certificate in Data Analytics, a 12-month program
 Master of Arts (MA) in Public Policy with Certificate in Research Methods, a 15-month program

Further, the school offers a Ph.D. program in public policy.

Harris Public Policy offers certificates in the following concentrations :

 Global Conflict
 International Development
 Economic Policy
 Health Policy
 Municipal Finance
 Policy Analysis
 Political Campaigns
 Survey Research
 Health Administration
 Global Health
 Computational Social Science

Dual degrees

Harris Public Policy partners with other professional schools and divisions within the University of Chicago to offer accelerated joint/dual degrees.
 MPP/MA – Joint Degree with the Center for Middle Eastern Studies
 MPP/MDiv – Joint Degree with the Divinity School
 MPP/MBA – Joint Degree with the Booth School of Business
 MPP/JD – Joint Degree with the Law School
 MPP/MA – Joint Degree with the School of Social Service Administration
 MA/MA – Dual Degree Committee on International Relations (CIR)
 BA/MPP – The Professional Option Program with the College

Cooperative Programs

Harris Public Policy runs cooperative programs partnered with international institutions .
 Fundação Getúlio Vargas (Getúlio Vargas Foundation), Instituto de Desenvolvimento Educacional (Educational Development Institute)
 Hanqing Advanced Institute of Economics and Finance, Renmin University of China
 Kemmy Business School, University of Limerick
 Consejo Nacional de Ciencia y Tecnología (National Council for Science and Technology of the United Mexican States)
 Yonsei University
 The Center for Strategic Research (SAM), Ministry of Foreign Affairs (Turkey)

Deans 
The following professors served as Dean of the Harris School of Public Policy:
 Robert T. Michael (1989-1994-Founding Dean, 1998–2002)
 Don L. Coursey (1996–1998)
Susan E. Mayer (2002–2009)
 Colm O'Muircheartaigh (2009–2014)
 Daniel Diermeier (2014–2016)
 Kerwin Charles (interim Dean 2016-2017)
 Katherine Baicker (2017–Present)

Notable faculty
 James J. Heckman – Nobel Prize winning economist, Henry Schultz Distinguished Service Professor, and director of the Center for the Economics of Human Development
 Roger Myerson – Nobel prize winning economist and game theorist, David L. Pearson Distinguished Service Professor of Global Conflict Studies
 Michael Kremer – Nobel prize winning developmental economist, University Professor and director of Development Innovation Lab.
 William G. Howell – Sydney Stein Professor in American Politics; Director, Center for Effective Government; Chair, Department of Political Science
 David O. Meltzer – Director of the Center for Health and the Social Sciences and Chair of the Committee on Clinical and Translational Science
 Tomas J. Philipson – Daniel Levin Professor of Public Policy Studies, Harris School of Public Policy; Associate Faculty Member, Department of Economics
 Robert Rosner – William E. Wrather Distinguished Service Professor in the Department of Astronomy & Astrophysics Department of Physics, and the Enrico Fermi Institute
 Chris Blattman – Ramalee E. Pearson Professor and member of The Pearson Institute for the Study and Resolution of Global Conflicts
 James A. Robinson – British economist and political scientist; University Professor at the Harris School of Public Policy
 Jens Ludwig – McCormick Foundation Professor of Social Service Administration, Law, and Public Policy
 Dan A. Black – Deputy dean and professor, senior fellow at the National Opinion Research Center
 Stephen Raudenbush – Lewis-Sebring Distinguished Service Professor, Department of Sociology and the College; Chair, Committee on Education
 Konstantin Sonin – John Dewey Distinguished Service Professor
Steven Durlauf – Economist and Professor of Public Policy and Education
Susan Mayer – Sociologist and Former Harris School Dean who has written books on poverty and education
Ariel Kalil - Behavioral Economist and author who co-directs the Behavioral Insights in Parenting Lab
Damon Jones - Behavioural Economist and expert in racial inequality

References

External links 
 Harris School of Public Policy's Website

Schools of the University of Chicago
Public administration schools in the United States
Public policy schools
Educational institutions established in 1988
1988 establishments in Illinois